Merl is a quarter in western Luxembourg City, in southern Luxembourg.

, the quarter has a population of 6,264 inhabitants.

References

Further reading
 

Quarters of Luxembourg City